is an airport located  northwest of Amakusa, Kumamoto, Japan, on the Amakusa Islands . Locals often refer to the airfield as Amakusa Airport. It is located on the northern side of the Amakusa Islands, north west of Amakusa city. Only one airline, Amakusa Airlines, uses this airfield, in which the airline is headquartered.

History

On September 6, 1982, the governor of Kumamoto Prefecture announced plans for a small airport during a regular press conference. On December 26, 1990, the Ministry of Land, Infrastructure and Transport approved the construction of the airfield. Construction began in 1992. The first plane that landed at this airport was a DHC-8 of Amakusa Airlines on November 19, 1999. The airfield was opened for public use on March 23, 2000.

In the spring of 2000, it had round trips between Amakusa Islands and Kumamoto twice a day. Starting from December 1, 2005, the operating time was extended from (8:00 am ～ 7:00 pm) to (7:40 am ～ 8:30 pm). It now has three round trips between Amakusa Airfield and Fukuoka Airport and one round trip between Amakusa Airfield and Kumamoto Airport (also one round trip between Kumamoto Airport and Kobe Airport) per day while using the same aircraft (aircraft registration number JA81AM). Since this airfield is served only by Amakusa Airlines and this airline only has one aircraft, the DHC-8 (pictured on the right) is the only regular, scheduled, aircraft that uses this airfield.

Airlines and destinations

Passenger

Airport communications
 Air / Ground (130.775 MHz)

Runway information

Landings are made using VOR/DME approach on runway 13/31. The lighting systems on runway 13/31 are High Intensity Runway Lights, Runway End Identification Lights, and Precision Approach Path Indicator (PAPI).

Airport facilities
 1st Floor
 Information Office
 Departure
 Arrival Lobby
 Amakusa Airlines Headquarters
 Washrooms
 Breast-feeding room
 Tourist Information
 Shop
 Taxi bus
 2nd Floor
 Observation deck
 Administration Office

Time zone
 UTC+9 Japan Standard Time

Ground transport
All ground transport is located on the first floor.

Bus

Kyushu Sanko Bus (九州産交バス) operate bus routes from airport to Amakusa city.

Road
The airport is connected by Kumamoto Prefecture Amakusa Highway No.334 and Itsuwa Road No.47.

References

External links
 Amakusa Airfield
 AXJ Amakusa Airfield

Airports in Japan
Transport in Kumamoto Prefecture
Buildings and structures in Kumamoto Prefecture